The Leichhardt Wanderers are a rugby league club based at Leichhardt, New South Wales. They compete in the Sydney Combined Competition. Their jersey is traditionally predominantly Red and Black. In recent years they have included white in their jersey. There were a number of Leichhardt clubs in the early years of Rugby League - Leichhardt Royals played in the Balmain JRL in 1908 and won the NSWRL 3rd Grade premiership in 1911. This club's final season was 1922. Leichhardt Gladstone won the C Grade of the Western Suburbs JRL in 1914, its first season in Rugby League. These two clubs had previously played Rugby Union. In 1918, Leichhardt Wanderers was formed by persons associated with the Leichhardt Boxing Stadium. Gladstone and Wanderers had a keen rivalry firstly in the Western Suburbs JRL where Gladstone were premiers in 1918 and then in the Annandale and Glebe competitions and finally in the Balmain JRL. Gladstone disbanded in the early 1940's.ref>https://leichhardtwanderers.com.au/</ref>

History

Notable Juniors
Corey Pearson (1995-04 Wests Tigers, St George Illawarra Dragons & Parramatta Eels)
Ben Kusto (1997-02 St George Dragons & Parramatta Eels)
Robbie Farah (2003- Wests Tigers, South Sydney Rabbitohs)
Bronson Harrison (2004-14 Wests Tigers, Canberra Raiders & St George Illawarra Dragons)
Jarred Farlow (2013-14 Wests Tigers)
Luke Brooks (2013- Wests Tigers)
Kane Evans (2014- Sydney Roosters, Parramatta Eels)
Kyle Lovett (2015-18 Wests Tigers)
Eloni Vunakece (2016-18 Sydney Roosters)
Lachlan Ilias (2021- South Sydney Rabbitohs)

See also

Rugby league in New South Wales

References

External links

Rugby league teams in Sydney
Rugby clubs established in 1911
1911 establishments in Australia
Italian-Australian backed sports clubs of New South Wales
University and college rugby league clubs
University and college sports clubs in Australia
University of Technology Sydney